Euouae (sometimes spelled Evovae) is an abbreviation used as a musical mnemonic in Latin psalters and other liturgical books of the Roman Rite. It stands for the syllables of the Latin words , taken from the Gloria Patri, a Christian doxology that concludes with the phrase . The mnemonic is used in the notation of the variable melodic endings of psalm tones in Gregorian chant.

In some cases, the letters of Euouae can be further shortened to E—E. A few books of English chant (notably Burgess and Palmer's The Plainchant Gradual) make use of oioueae for the equivalent English phrase, "world without end. Amen".

According to Guinness World Records, Euouae is the longest word in the English language consisting only of vowels, and also the English word with the most consecutive vowels. As a mnemonic originating from Latin, it is unclear that it should count as an English word; however, it is found in the unabridged Collins English Dictionary.

Its all-vowel composition makes it an effective play for certain kinds of vowel-heavy Scrabble racks, and the plural form ("euouaes") means a bingo can be made in certain situations. Both the singular and plural forms of the word are contained within the official Collins Scrabble Words dictionary and various other dictionaries.

A similar abbreviation, Aevia (or Aeuia), was used to abbreviate the word  in medieval Office books. In Venetian and other Italian Office books of the 16th century, an equivalent abbreviation, Hal'a, or Hal'ah, can be substituted for Aevia.

References

 Apel, Willi: Gregorian Chant. Bloomington: Indiana University Press, 1990. .
 Dyer, Joseph: «Roman Catholic Church Music» en Grove Music Online  ed. L. Macy. 
 Hiley, David: «Chant» in Performance Practice: Music before 1600, eds. Howard Mayer Brown & Stanley Sadie. New York: W. W. Norton, 1990, pp. 37–54. 
 Hiley, David: Western Plainchant: A Handbook. Oxford: Clarendon Press, 1995. .
 Levy, Kenneth: «Plainchant» in Grove Music Online  ed. L. Macy.

External links
 

Medieval music theory
Music mnemonics